Rustom Mulla Feroze (born 1922; date of death unknown) was an Indian cyclist. He competed in the sprint event at the 1948 Summer Olympics.

References

External links
 

1922 births
Year of death missing
Indian male cyclists
Olympic cyclists of India
Cyclists at the 1948 Summer Olympics
Place of birth missing
Parsi people